Alcides Peña Jiménez (born 14 January 1989) is a Bolivian footballer who plays for Real Santa Cruz as a striker.

Club career
He enrolled in the Oriente Petrolero and began developing his football skills at age twelve. In 2006, Peña began his pro-career with hometown club Oriente Petrolero after being spotted by Víctor Hugo Antelo, the team manager at that time.

In June 2016, Peña was loaned to Colombian club Atlético Bucaramanga.

International career
Peña made his debut for Bolivia in 2010, and has played in FIFA World Cup qualification matches.

References

External links
 
 
 
 

1989 births
Living people
Sportspeople from Santa Cruz de la Sierra
Bolivian footballers
Bolivian expatriate footballers
Bolivia international footballers
Bolivian Primera División players
Categoría Primera A players
Oriente Petrolero players
Atlético Bucaramanga footballers
The Strongest players
Sport Boys Warnes players
Real Santa Cruz players
2011 Copa América players
2015 Copa América players
Association football forwards
Bolivian expatriate sportspeople in Colombia
Expatriate footballers in Colombia